Francis Edward Tachie-Menson was a Ghanaian politician. He served as a Deputy Minister, Chairman of the Ghana Housing Corporation, a member of parliament, and a state minister in the first republic. He was the member of parliament for the Denkyira constituency from 1954 to 1965 and the member of parliament for the Edina-Eguafo constituency from 1965 to 1966. He also served as Ghana's Minister for Housing from 1965 to 1966.

Early life and education
Tachie-Menson was born on 19 August 1910 at Elmina in the Central Region of Ghana (then Gold Coast). He obtained a certificate in Automobile Engineering (Mechanical Engineering) from the City and Guilds of London Institute. He later earned a certificate of Competency in Workers' Education (Trade Unionism) and Leadership from the University of Wisconsin–Madison. After teaching for a while, he entered the Government Technical School (now Ghana Senior High Technical School, Takoradi) in March, 1931 completing his course in April, 1934.

Career
Tachie-Menson begun as a pupil teacher at the Roman Catholic School in Bekwai. After teaching for a year, he entered the Government Technical School to complete a 3-year course after which he joined the Department of Posts and Telegraphs in Accra as a linesman on 8 May 1934. On 24 January 1939, he was promoted to the rank of a 2nd grade sub inspector and in 1953 while working in that capacity, he was elected president of the Gold Coast Trades Union Congress (GCTUC). He remained in this position until his resignation on 30 June 1954.

Politics
In June 1954, Tachie-Menson was elected to represent the Denkyira constituency on the ticket of the Convention People's Party (CPP). While serving in parliament, he was appointed Parliamentary Secretary (Deputy Minister) to the Ministry of Defence in 1958. He served in this capacity until he was relieved of his duties as a Deputy Minister on 1 April 1961. In February 1963, he became the Chairman of the Housing Corporation and on 1 February 1965 he was made Minister of Housing. That same year, he became the member of parliament for the Edina-Eguafo constituency. Tachie-Menson held these appointments until the overthrow of the Nkrumah government on 24 February 1966.

Personal life
Tachie-Menson loved to listen to music and engage in sporting activities in his leisure time.

See also
List of MLAs elected in the 1954 Gold Coast legislative election
 List of MLAs elected in the 1956 Gold Coast legislative election
 List of MPs elected in the 1965 Ghanaian parliamentary election

References

1910 births
Ghanaian MPs 1954–1956
Ghanaian MPs 1956–1965
Ghanaian MPs 1965–1966
Convention People's Party (Ghana) politicians
20th-century Ghanaian politicians
University of Wisconsin–Madison alumni
Year of death missing
Defence ministers of Ghana